Anson McCook Beard (March 17, 1874 – November 9, 1929) was an American football player. 

A native of Richmond, Virginia, Beard played college football for Yale. He joined the school in 1891, and was part of four consecutive national championships between that year and 1894. Mid-season of 1894, Beard left the Yale football team, saying he "cannot spare the time from his studies for athletics" and that his father objected to football. Despite missing nearly half of the season, Beard was named to the College Football All-America team following the season, in which Yale compiled a 16–0 record. After his playing career Beard became a lawyer. In 1902, he married Ruth Hill, the daughter of James J. Hill. With her he had two children. He died on November 9, 1929, in Tuxedo Park, New York.

References

1874 births
19th-century players of American football
American football tackles
Yale Bulldogs football players
1929 deaths